"Scumbag" is a song recorded by Canadian singer-songwriter Goody Grace. The song was released on October 30, 2019, through Bananabeat Records and Atlantic Records, as a single. The song features the rock band Blink-182, and was produced by the production duo The Futuristics. It was written by Blink-182 bassist Mark Hoppus and drummer Travis Barker, as well as Futuristics members Joe Khajadourian and Alex Schwartz, songwriters Michael Pollack and Jake Torrey, and Tom Higgenson, best known as the frontman for rock band Plain White T's.

Commercially, "Scumbag" only charted in the U.S., where it peaked at number 28 on Billboard Alternative Airplay chart.

Background
Goody Grace first rose to prominence in the late 2010s, for his stylistic mix of hip hop and rock. He garnered an online audience with a series of cover songs, followed by his single "Two Shots", which preceded a deal with major-label Atlantic. Grace grew up listening to Blink-182, and viewed the collaboration as an "honor". He first interacted with the band's drummer, Travis Barker, backstage at a concert. The two exchanged information, and kept in touch using social media. Barker later invited the singer-songwriter to join the band on tour, and proposed they record together. Grace had been working on "Scumbag" with production team the Futuristics, and suggested Barker and Blink bassist Mark Hoppus contribute to it as well. Hoppus assisted with developing the song's bridge.

The single was promoted as featuring Blink-182, though the band's guitarist at the time, Matt Skiba, is absent from the collaboration. The trio performed the single in an appearance on the late night talk show Jimmy Kimmel Live!, aired February 27, 2020.

Music video
The song's music video debuted alongside the single's premiere on October 30, 2019. Directed by Kyle Cogan and Kyle Dunleavy, the video depicts Grace struggling after a break-up, floating through the streets of his hometown of Selkirk, Manitoba. Hoppus and Barker appear in the video as well.

Track listing
 Digital download
 "Scumbag" (featuring Blink-182) – 3:30

 Acoustic
 "Scumbag" – 3:29

Remixes
 MAKJ Remix
 "Scumbag" (featuring Blink-182) – 2:46

 Absofacto Remix
 "Scumbag" (featuring Blink-182) – 2:43

Charts

Release history

References

2019 singles
2019 songs
Blink-182 songs
Songs written by Mark Hoppus
Songs written by Travis Barker
Song recordings produced by the Futuristics
Songs written by Joe Khajadourian
Songs written by Alex Schwartz
Songs written by Michael Pollack (musician)